Bara Bagh Cemetery, Lasbela is an ancient cemetery of the Jams of Lasbela of the Lasbela princely state, containing more than 100 graves of which 40 belong to the Jams.

Location
It is located at Bara Bagh, eight kilometers away from Lasbela District, Balochistan, Pakistan.

Notable burials
 Ghulam Qadir Khan (1920–1988)
 Jam Mohammad Yousaf (1954–2013)

References

Mausoleums in Balochistan, Pakistan
History of Balochistan
Monuments and memorials in Balochistan, Pakistan
Buildings and structures in Lasbela
Archaeological sites in Balochistan, Pakistan
Cemeteries in Balochistan, Pakistan